Hyloxalus vergeli is a species of frog in the family Dendrobatidae.
Its natural habitats are cloud forests near streams. It tolerates some minor habitat disturbance.

References

vergeli
Amphibians of the Andes
Amphibians of Colombia
Endemic fauna of Colombia
Amphibians described in 1940
Taxonomy articles created by Polbot